Garmeh-ye Jonubi Rural District is in the Central District of Mianeh County, East Azerbaijan province, Iran. At the National Census of 2006, its population was 8,205 in 1,889 households. There were 6,331 inhabitants in 1,773 households at the following census of 2011. At the most recent census of 2016, the population of the rural district was 5,394 in 1,826 households. The largest of its 49 villages was Gundughdi, with 1,024 people.

References 

Meyaneh County

Rural Districts of East Azerbaijan Province

Populated places in East Azerbaijan Province

Populated places in Meyaneh County